Piqué work was a type of decorative work made by inlaying tiny points or pins of gold or other precious metals in patterns or pictures on tortoiseshell from the now endangered Hawksbill sea turtle (Eretmochelys imbricata) or, less commonly, ivory. In 1770 Matthew Boulton (1728 – 1809) developed methods of producing piqué work panels in factories. The craft reached its height in 17th and 18th century France, and was highly prized.

One remarquable workshop was working in Naples around 1740 and was headed by Giussepe Sarao.

Footnotes

External links
 Illustrations of piqué-work from the Victoria and Albert Museum, London. 
 "Tortoiseshell Snuff Boxes." Well-illustrated downloadable article in pdf file from: 

Decorative arts